Don "Monk" Meineke (October 30, 1930 – September 3, 2013) was an American basketball player. He played college basketball for the University of Dayton and was a consensus second-team All-American in 1952. He later played professionally in the National Basketball Association and won the inaugural Rookie of the Year award in 1953.

College career
Meineke averaged 20.6 points as a junior for the Dayton Flyers, carrying the team to an NIT runner-up finish in 1951. He averaged 21.1 points per game as a senior and led the team to another second-place finish in the NIT in 1952. Meineke was an AP second-team All-American selection after his senior year.

Professional career
Meineke received the National Basketball Association's first Rookie of the Year Award after the 1952–53 NBA season while playing for the Fort Wayne Pistons. He led the league in personal fouls and disqualifications the same season. The 26 disqualifications he had in his first year is still the NBA single-season record. His 334 personal fouls in only 68 games gave him an average of more than 4.9 fouls per game.

Meineke played for the Rochester Royals in the 1955–56 season, and after sitting out the 1956–57 season, rejoined the relocated Cincinnati Royals in 1957–58.

Personal life
Meineke was married to Mary Jane (Hautman) and with her had four children.

NBA career statistics

Regular season 
{| class="wikitable sortable" style="font-size:95%; text-align:right;"
!Year
!Team
!GP
!MPG
!FG%
!FT%
!RPG
!APG
!PPG
|-
| style="text-align:left;" |1952–53
| style="text-align:left;" |Fort Wayne
|68
|33.1
|.381
|.783
|6.9
|2.2
|10.7
|-
| style="text-align:left;" |1953–54
| style="text-align:left;" |Fort Wayne
|71
|20.9
|.344
|.805
|5.2
|1.1
|5.7
|-
| style="text-align:left;" |1954–55
| style="text-align:left;" |Fort Wayne
|68
|15.1
|.372
|.700
|3.6
|0.9
|5.8
|-
| style="text-align:left;" |1955–56
| style="text-align:left;" |Rochester
|69
|18.1
|.372
|.700
|3.6
|1.5
|7.1
|-
| style="text-align:left;" |1957–58
| style="text-align:left;" |Cincinnati
|67
|11.8
|.356
|.647
|3.4
|0.6
|4.9
|- class="sortbottom"
| colspan="2" style="text-align:center;" |Career
|343
|19.8
|.367
|.756
|4.7
|1.3
|6.8

Playoffs

References

External links
Where Are They Now- Don Meineke @ nbrpa.com
Career stats at basketball-reference.com

1930 births
2013 deaths
All-American college men's basketball players
American men's basketball players
Basketball players from Dayton, Ohio
Centers (basketball)
Cincinnati Royals players
Dayton Flyers men's basketball players
Fort Wayne Pistons draft picks
Fort Wayne Pistons players
Power forwards (basketball)
Rochester Royals players